George Francis Hagerup (22 January 1853 – 8 February 1921) was a Norwegian law professor, diplomat, politician for the Conservative Party and women's rights advocate. He was the 7th prime minister of Norway from 1895 to 1898 and from 1903 to 1905, and leader of the Conservative Party from 1899 to 1902. As a legal scholar, he is known for his contributions to the development of public international law, and was chairman of the Institut de Droit International. He was his party's most active supporter of women's suffrage, and was a co-founder, board member and honorary member of the Norwegian Association for Women's Rights.

Biography
Francis Hagerup grew up at Horten in Vestfold, Norway. He was a son of admiral and cabinet minister Henrik Steffens Hagerup (1806–1859) and Nicoline Christine Jenssen (1808–1862). He graduated with the cand.jur. degree at the Royal Frederick University in 1876, received a grant to study abroad, and became a research fellow at the Royal Frederick University in 1879. He obtained the dr.juris degree in 1885, and was professor of law at the Royal Frederick University from 1887 to 1906. He was minister of justice in the Second cabinet Stang from 2 May 1893 to 14 October 1895. In August 1895 he was Finance minister. He was a member of the Storting from 1901 to 1906.

He served as Prime Minister of Norway for two terms. First from October 14, 1895; secondly  from October 22, 1903. In social policy, Hagerup's time as Prime Minister saw the passage of a child care law in 1896 that increased the power of local authorities and courts over neglected and abused children. Following his two bouts as Prime Minister, he  served as ambassador to Copenhagen, The Hague, and Brussels. From 1916 he was ambassador in Stockholm.

Hagerup was passionately involved in the development of public international law. From 1897 he was member of the Institut de Droit International, of which he became the chairman in 1912. In 1907 he headed the Norwegian delegation at the second peace conference in The Hague. He was also delegate at international conferences regarding admiralty law. In 1920 he led the Norwegian delegation when the League of Nations convened for the first time in Geneva. The same year he was elected to the Law committee under the League council. In 1888, he founded Tidsskrift for Retsvidenskab (Journal of Jurisprudence), and served as its editor until his death.

Hagerup was also member of the Norwegian Nobel Committee from 1 January 1907 until his death in 1921.

Hagerup was the most prominent Conservative Party politician to support women's suffrage and was active in the women's rights movement. In 1884 he was a co-founder of the Norwegian Association for Women's Rights and he was also a member of the first board of the association. In 1914 he became an honorary member of the association.

Personal life
He was married  in 1880 to Frederikke Dorothea Bødtker (1853-1919). He died in Kristiania (now Oslo) and was buried at  Vår Frelsers gravlund.

References

Other sources
 George Francis Hagerup biography at government.no (taken from Norsk Biografisk Leksikon - Norwegian Biographical Encyclopedia)
Thane, Pat (1996) Foundations of the Welfare State (Longman Social Policy 2nd edition) 

1853 births
1921 deaths
People from Horten
University of Oslo alumni
Norwegian academics
Norwegian jurists
19th-century Norwegian politicians
Academic staff of the Faculty of Law, University of Oslo
Ambassadors of Norway to Denmark
Ambassadors of Norway to the Netherlands
Ambassadors of Norway to Belgium
Ambassadors of Norway to Sweden
Government ministers of Norway
Presidents of the Storting
Members of the Storting
Delegates to the Hague Peace Conferences
Ministers of Finance of Norway
Leaders of the Conservative Party (Norway)
Prime Ministers of Norway
Burials at the Cemetery of Our Saviour
Norwegian Association for Women's Rights people
Ministers of Justice of Norway